Middle Amana is an unincorporated community and census-designated place (CDP) in Iowa County, Iowa, United States. It is the largest of the seven villages of the Amana Colonies, all designated as a National Historic Landmark. As of the 2010 Census, the population of Middle Amana was 581.

Geography
Middle Amana is in northeastern Iowa County, on the north side of the valley of the Iowa River.

Demographics

History
In 1881, Middle Amana contained a woolen mill, starch factory, machine shop, wagon shop, blacksmith shop, book printing and bindery, brick yard, general store, school, and meeting house.

Education
Clear Creek–Amana Community School District operates public schools serving the community. Amana Elementary School is in Middle Amana, and Clear Creek–Amana Middle School and Clear Creek–Amana High School are in Tiffin.

Amana High School in Middle Amana was established after a 1935 bond election. The school closed in 1991.

Clear Creek–Amana Middle School was previously in Middle Amana.

Notable person
Bill Zuber, baseball player and restaurateur

References

External links
Amana Church Society 

Amana Colonies
Geography of Iowa County, Iowa